Fibe Mini is a Japanese soft drink with added dietary fiber produced by Otsuka Pharmaceutical. It was launched in 1988, and is often considered the first "functional food". The functional ingredient is polydextrose, which has been associated with health benefits. The drink also includes minerals and vitamins. 

It was a hit upon launch and began the functional food trend in Japan from 1988 to 1989, a period that produced 51 dietary fiber drinks. The fiber sources of these products were often added to milk and soft drinks.

References

External links
 (in Japanese)
 (Hong Kong)

Japanese drinks
Soft drinks
Dietary supplements
Otsuka Pharmaceutical